The Reverend Father Protopresbyter George Dion Dragas (born 1944) is an  Orthodox Christian priest, theologian, and writer. He is currently professor of patristics at Holy Cross Greek Orthodox School of Theology in Brookline, Massachusetts.

Life 
Protopresbyter George Dion. Dragas, Ph.D., D.D. (Hon.), is Professor of Patrology at Holy Cross Greek Orthodox School of Theology in Brookline, Massachusetts. He was born in Athens, Greece, where he received his first education and studied science. He studied theology at the University of Edinburgh (B.D.), Princeton Theological Seminary (M.Th.) and Durham University, England (Ph.D.). He taught patristics at Durham University in England from 1974 to 1995.

Since 1995, he has been teaching at Holy Cross in Brookline. At present, he is also a Visiting Professor at Université de Sherbrooke in Quebec, Canada, and Visiting Professor of Eastern Orthodox Monasticism at Holy Trinity Orthodox Seminary in Jordanville, New York. He is a specialist on St. Athanasius and the Alexandrian theologians and is responsible for updating with critical introductions the Athens reprint of Migne's Patrologia Graeca (about 80 volumes published so far). He is also the General Editor of the Patristic and Ecclesiastical Texts and Translations and the Orthodox Theological Library series published by the Orthodox Research Institute.

He is a member of the Academie Internationale des Science Religieuses (Brussels) and has been involved in Ecumenical Dialogues for many years as representative of the Ecumenical Patriarchate of Constantinople. In 2000, the Faculty of Theology of the St. Clement National University of Sofia, Bulgaria, conferred on him the degree of Doctor of Divinity (D.D.) honoris causa. In 2005, the Department of Pastoral and Social Theology of the Faculty of Theology of the Aristotle University of Thessaloniki conferred on him the degree of Doctor of Theology (D.Th.) honoris causa.

Works 
Greek Orthodox Patrology: An Introduction to the Study of the Church Fathers - Panagiotes K. Chrestou (2005) (editor and translator)
The Lord's Prayer according to Saint Makarios of Corinth (2005)
Saint Athanasius of Alexandria: Original Research and New Perspectives (2005)
Ecclesiasticus II: Orthodox Icons, Saints, Feasts and Prayer (2005)
Ecclesiasticus I: Introducing Eastern Orthodoxy (2004)
Against Those Unwilling to Confess that the Holy Virgin Is Theotokos - Saint Cyril of Alexandria (2004) (editor and translator)
An Outline of Orthodox Patristic Dogmatics - John S. Romanides (2004) (editor and translator)
On the Priesthood and the Holy Eucharist According to St. Symeon of Thessalonica, Patriarch Kallinikos of Constantinople and St. Mark Eugenikos of Ephesus (2004) 
 St. Cyril of Alexandria's Teaching on the Priesthood (2004)

References

Eastern Orthodox theologians
Greek theologians
Alumni of the University of Edinburgh
Alumni of Durham University
Academics of Durham University
Living people
1944 births
Date of birth missing (living people)